Stephen Gitahi Kiama (born 1964) is a Kenyan veterinary surgeon and academic who, effective 3 January 2020, serves as the 8th vice chancellor of the University of Nairobi, the oldest public university of Kenya.

Background and education
According to his online curriculum vitae, he was born in Othaya, Nyeri County in central Kenya, in 1964. After attending local elementary and secondary schools, he was admitted to the University of Nairobi (UoN), in 1986. He graduated in 1990, with a Bachelor of Veterinary Medicine. He followed that with a Master of Veterinary Anatomy, in 1995, also at UoN. Later in 2001, he graduated with a Doctor of Philosophy in Structural Biology from the University of Bern in Switzerland.

Career
Upon his graduation with his first degree, Kiama was hired as an assistant lecturer at the University of Nairobi. Over time, he rose through the ranks, making lecturer, senior lecturer, associate professor and full professor. At the time of his appointment as vice chancellor, he was the Deputy Vice Chancellor for human resource and administration.

As of 2020, Kiama has spent the last 34 years of his adult life at UoN, either as a student, academic employee or university administrator. He is credited with raising, in collaboration with others, a total of KSh1.018 billion (approximately US$10.2 million), from donors, sponsors and well-wishers towards university and related programs.

Other considerations
Kiama served as the founding director of the Wangari Maathai Institute for Peace and Environmental Studies, at the UoN. He was also able to secure full scholarships for 16 post-doctorate, PhD and MSc students at the university. At the time he was appointed Vice Chancellor, he  was the chairman of the University Executive Board committee responsible for  record management which oversaw digitisation of student records and the establishment of a biometric student platform.

As of January 2020, Professor Kiama had supervised 12 PhD and 14 MSc students who completed their studies at Makerere University, Rhodes University and the University of Nairobi. He was also actively supervising three more at the time. He has published widely in peer-reviewed journals and is credited with over 140 journal and conference publications.

See also
 George Magoha

Succession table as Vice-Chancellor of the University of Nairobi

References

External links
 Website of the University of Nairobi

1964 births
Living people
Kikuyu people
Kenyan veterinarians
People from Nyeri County
University of Bern alumni
University of Nairobi alumni
Academic staff of the University of Nairobi
Vice-chancellors of universities in Kenya